Aquarius Tour was the debut concert tour by American singer Tinashe. The tour supported Tinashe's debut studio album, Aquarius, which was released on October 7, 2014 by RCA Records. The tour began on December 5, 2014 and concluded March 17, 2015 and showcased material from Tinashe's debut studio album and mix-tapes. The tour visited Europe, North America, Oceania, and Asia.

Background 
On November 12, 2014 Tinashe announced that she would be going on her debut concert in December of that year.

Shows

References

2014 concert tours
Tinashe